The 1985 Brit Awards were the 5th edition of the biggest annual pop music awards in the United Kingdom. They are run by the British Phonographic Industry and took place on 11 February 1985 at Grosvenor House Hotel in London. This year marked the first presentation of the British Video of the Year and Soundtrack/Cast Recording awards, and the last presentation of the defunct International Artist award.

For the first time, the awards ceremony was televised by the BBC.

Performances
 Alison Moyet – "All Cried Out"
 Bronski Beat – "Smalltown Boy"
 Howard Jones – "What Is Love"
 Nik Kershaw – "Wouldn't It Be Good"
 Tina Turner – "What's Love Got to Do with It"

Winners and nominees

Multiple nominations and awards
The following artists received multiple awards and/or nominations.

References

External links
1985 Brit Awards at Brits.co.uk

Brit Awards
Brit Awards
BRIT Awards
BRIT Awards
Brit Awards
Brit Awards